Charles Ephraim Burchfield (April 9, 1893 – January 10, 1967) was an American painter and visionary artist, known for his passionate watercolors of nature scenes and townscapes. The largest collection of Burchfield's paintings, archives and journals are in the collection of the Burchfield Penney Art Center in Buffalo. His paintings are in the collections of more than 109 museums in the USA and have been the subject of exhibitions at the Metropolitan Museum of Art, the Whitney Museum of American Art, the Hammer Museum, and the Museum of Modern Art, as well as other prominent institutions.

Life

Born in Ashtabula, Ohio, Burchfield was raised by his widowed mother in Salem, Ohio. Most of his early works were done at this house, where he lived from the ages of five to 28, and which has since been converted into a museum. While he did think of being a nature writer in high school, he eventually focused entirely on the visual aspect of his creativity, writing short descriptive pieces for the painting on the back of the mount. Stimulated by the nature descriptions of others, his preferred American writers were Thoreau and Willa Cather and later he developed a passion for reading works by Finnish writers describing nature.

Burchfield graduated from the Cleveland Institute of Art in 1916.  Later in life he acknowledged the profound effect on his own development by a teacher at the CIA, the artist Henry Keller. Keller led a generation of Ohio watercolor painters of the Cleveland School which included Burchfield.

On becoming engaged, Burchfield moved to Buffalo, New York in 1921, where he was employed as a designer at the H.M. Birge wallpaper company. The following year he married Bertha Kenreich in Greenford, Ohio. In 1928 with a fifth child on the way, he approached artist-gallerist Frank Rehn to see whether he could afford to paint full-time by selling through the Rehn gallery in New York. Though the decision to leave Birge preceded the Great Depression, his work continued to sell. In 1952, he was elected to the National Academy of Design as an Associate member, and became a full member in 1954.

In 1925, Burchfield had moved from Buffalo to the adjacent suburb of West Seneca, New York, spending the rest of his life in the rural neighborhood of Gardenville. He is buried in Oakwood Cemetery in the Village of East Aurora, New York.

Work

According to Burchfield's friend and colleague Edward Hopper, "The work of Charles Burchfield is most decidedly founded, not on art, but on life, and the life that he knows and loves best."
Burchfield has been more recently described as "the mystic, cryptic painter of transcendental landscapes, trees with telekinetic halos, and haunted houses emanating ectoplasmic auras." Jerry Saltz suggests his influences as van Gogh, Caspar David Friedrich, Marsden Hartley, John Marin, "calendar art, and Sunday painting." Like Hopper, he seemed to have left cubism out of the equation.

Process
Since its heyday in the nineteenth century, watercolor had remained a popular style but Burchfield was unique among his major contemporaries for working exclusively within the medium. Unlike most watercolorists, he stood at an easel. He applied his colors with a "dry brush" technique (very little water) on machine-made paper, often reworking the surface during the process or sometimes many years later.

Burchfield was an unflagging advocate for the virtues of watercolors, and chafed at the popular misconception of them as fragile and impermanent. He was aware that some fading and hue changes were likely to occur, but he believed that proper handling and display procedures would keep water-based artwork as vibrant as any other medium. Modern curators typically show watercolors like Burchfield's under reduced lighting and for shorter lengths of time than oil-based exhibitions.

Art periods
His work is usually divided into three periods comprising figuration, houses and small town scenes; and abstractions depicting moods (frequently morbid and fearful). Insect and frog sounds have their own calligraphic strokes, and cicada sounds are depicted with zigzag strokes radiating outward; flowers and houses seem to have faces, not always pleasant.

Early work
Burchfield's style was largely developed by the summer of 1915, after his junior year at the Cleveland School of Art, as he sketched and painted constantly in and around Salem, OH, "gathering the materials for a lifetime," according to his journals. Exposed in school to modernist European trends, he developed an almost fauvist use of broad areas of simplified color, enlivened by delightful particularizations of nature, and in 1917, began combining visual motifs projecting human moods, often disturbing, into the pictures. Assigned to the camouflage unit in the Army in 1918, he even worked his designs into painting schemes disguising tanks and artificial hills. Biographers note his exposure to modernist trends and traditional Chinese painting while in art school but overlook that the hallucinatory quality in his work may be partly traced to an episode of nervous exhaustion in 1911 while a junior in high school. Determined to record all the area's flowering plants that spring, he stayed up late at night painting whole bouquets of the blooms and had a bout of what was referred to at the time as "brain fever," which might now be termed mania. He seems to have learned to use it as a source of energy and inspiration, and his school transcript records only three days' absence that semester. Painting constantly from 1915, even while working full-time in summer and after college, he sketched on walks to and from home at lunchtime and completed paintings based on them at night. Half of his lifetime output of paintings was produced while living in Salem from 1915 to 1917. The fact that so many paintings of this period were depictions of scenes visible from the windows of his boyhood home prompted Henry Adams, curator of drawings at the Cleveland Museum of Art, to call it "the most important house in American art history."

Middle Work
In his middle period, from 1919 until 1943, prompted partly by the need to provide financially for his new family with salable pictures for the New York art market, he depicted small-town and industrial scenes that put him in the category of the American Scene or Regionalist movement, and he was able to support himself through his painting from 1928, when he resigned his wallpaper design position at Birge & Co. in Buffalo, NY. These large paintings have a solid look unusual in watercolors, resembling oil paintings, and they are the works most often seen in art history texts. Though one critic commented that Burchfield was "Edward Hopper on a rainy day," a 1936 Life Magazine article named him one of America's 10 greatest painters.

Late Work
In his late period, from 1943 on, possibly facing a psychological crisis as he turned 50, he returned to the preoccupations of the early work, incorporating the painting skills he had mastered during his middle period (which he eventually saw as a "diversion" from his true path), and developed large, hallucinatory  renditions of nature captured in swirling strokes, heightened colors and exaggerated forms. In his writings he expressed an aim to depict an earlier era in the history of human consciousness when man saw gods and spirits in natural objects and forces, and art historian and critic John Canaday predicted in a 1966 review in The New York Times that the grandeur and power of these pictures would be Burchfield's enduring achievement.

Legacy

The Charles Burchfield Center at Buffalo State College was dedicated in his honor in 1966. It was renamed The Burchfield Art Center in 1983 with an expanded mission to support a multi-arts focus. Between 1991 and 1994, the museum received a series of gifts from Charles Rand Penney, Ph. D., of more than 1,300 works by Western New York artists. Included in that gift were 183 works by Charles E. Burchfield. In honor of such a substantial donation the museum was again renamed as The Burchfield Penney Art Center.

The Charles E. Burchfield Nature & Art Center in West Seneca, New York is named in his honor. Developed in 1999, the 29 acre art and nature center complex also contains wild and cultivated gardens, a large playground, nature trails, playgrounds and an outdoor amphitheater alongside the banks of the Buffalo Creek.

Of his current legacy, Saltz writes that "Consciously or not, recent painters like Peter Doig, Verne Dawson, Gregory Amenoff, Kurt Lightner, and Ellen Altfest are channeling bits of Burchfield's visionary vibe."

Collections
Amon Carter Museum, Fort Worth, Texas
Brauer Museum of Art, Valparaiso University
Burchfield Penney Art Center, Buffalo State College, Buffalo, New York. The Burchfield Penney Art Center holds the world's largest collection of Charles E. Burchfield paintings, studio objects and Burchfield memorabilia.
Butler Institute of American Art, Youngstown, Ohio
Canton Museum of Art, Canton, Ohio
Carnegie Museum of Art, Pittsburgh, Pennsylvania
Cleveland Museum of Art, Cleveland, Ohio
Columbus Museum of Art, Columbus, Ohio
Detroit Institute of Arts, Detroit, Michigan
Everson Museum of Art, Syracuse, New York
Fine Arts Museums of San Francisco, San Francisco, California
Hunter Museum of American Art, Chattanooga, Tennessee
Kalamazoo Institute of Arts, Kalamazoo, MI
Lehigh University Art Galleries, Bethlehem, Pennsylvania
Madison Museum of Contemporary Art, Madison, Wisconsin
Memphis Brooks Museum of Art, Memphis, Tennessee
Metropolitan Museum of Art, New York, New York
Minneapolis Institute of Art, Minneapolis, Minnesota
Munson-Williams-Proctor Arts Institute, Utica, New York
Museum of Modern Art, New York, New York
The Phillips Collection, Washington, D.C.
Reynolda House Museum of American Art, Winston-Salem, NC
Philadelphia Museum of Art, Philadelphia, PA
Thyssen-Bornemisza Museum, Madrid, Spain
Smithsonian American Art Museum, Washington, DC
Vero Beach Museum of Art, Vero Beach, Florida
Virginia Museum of Fine Arts, Richmond, Virginia
Wadsworth Atheneum, Hartford, Connecticut
Wellin Museum of Art (Hamilton College), Clinton, New York
Whitney Museum of American Art, New York, New York

References

External links
Charles Burchfield at Wikicommons
Burchfield Penney Art Center
Charles Burchfield at DC Moore Gallery
Charles E. Burchfiled – Burchfield Penney Art Center
Charles E. Burchfield Nature & Art Center
Charles Burchfield Homestead Society Website
Charles Burchfield Artwork Examples on AskART.

20th-century American painters
American male painters
American watercolorists
1893 births
1967 deaths
People from Salem, Ohio
People from Ashtabula, Ohio
Cleveland School (arts community)
Charles Burchfield
Members of the American Academy of Arts and Letters